Benjamin Ludlow Bathurst, 2nd Viscount Bledisloe, QC (2 October 1899 – 17 September 1979) was a British barrister.

Background and education
Born at Westbury, Wiltshire, Bledisloe was the eldest son of Charles Bathurst, 1st Viscount Bledisloe, and the Hon. Bertha Susan Lopes, daughter of Henry Lopes, 1st Baron Ludlow. He was educated at Eton and Magdalen College, Oxford. He was a distinguished rower at Oxford, helping the Magdalen crew win the Grand Challenge Cup at Henley in 1920.

Career
In 1927, he was called to the Bar at the Inner Temple and Lincoln's Inn.

Bledisloe fought in the First World War and gained the rank of Second Lieutenant in the service of the Royal Artillery. He returned to military service during the Second World War, where he served as a Squadron Leader in the Royal Air Force. In 1956, he was appointed a bencher of Lincoln's Inn. Bathurst succeeded his father in the viscountcy in 1958. He was a regular contributor in the House of Lords, speaking 64 times between 1959 and 1979.

Family
Lord Bledisloe married Joan, daughter of Otto Krishaber, on 2 June 1933. They had two sons:

 Christopher Hiley Ludlow Bathurst, 3rd Viscount Bledisloe (born 24 June 1934, died 12 May 2009)
 Hon. David Charles Lopes Bathurst (born 15 December 1937, died 1992)

Lord Bledisloe died in September 1979, aged 79, and was succeeded in the viscountcy by his eldest son. Lady Bledisloe died in December 1999.

References

External links

1899 births
1979 deaths
Viscounts in the Peerage of the United Kingdom
Royal Artillery officers
Royal Air Force officers
British Army personnel of World War I
Royal Air Force personnel of World War II
Alumni of Magdalen College, Oxford
People educated at Eton College
Members of the Inner Temple
Members of Lincoln's Inn
Benjamin
English King's Counsel
English barristers